Red Eagle Mountain is located in the Lewis Range, Glacier National Park in the U.S. state of Montana. The mountain was named according to James Willard Schultz, "by his Indian wife in 1887, for her uncle, Red Eagle, who had saved their son's life with his prayers to the Sun".

Geology

Like other mountains in Glacier National Park, the peak is composed of sedimentary rock laid down during the Precambrian to Jurassic periods.

Climate
Based on the Köppen climate classification, the peak is located in an alpine subarctic climate zone with long, cold, snowy winters, and cool to warm summers. Temperatures can drop below −10 °F with wind chill factors below −30 °F.

Gallery

See also
 Mountains and mountain ranges of Glacier National Park (U.S.)

References

Red Eagle
Red Eagle
Lewis Range